; September 29, 1916, Tokyo – February 2, 1996, Tokyo) was a Japanese composer.

Minao studied botany at Tokyo University, graduating in 1939, and made further studies in the fine arts while studying music privately with Saburo Moroi and playing cello as a member of the Tokyo String Orchestra. His early works are mostly for chamber groups and are indebted to Romanticism.

In 1948, he took a position as a professor of theory at Tōhō Gakuen School of Music, working there through 1955; he also taught at Ochanomizu Women's College in 1952, remaining there until 1959. He began incorporating elements of serialism and musique concrete in the 1950s, and wrote for increasingly larger orchestral forces.

Shibata accepted a professorship at Tokyo University of the Arts in 1959, where he remained until 1969, and while there his compositions incorporated aspects of aleatory music. He wrote pieces which used graphic or artistic scoring notations and made use of microtonal sonorities. From 1973 he composed theater works which combined elements of Japanese folk music with European-derived song structures.

Shibata also write extensively on music history and theory, and was an editor of The New Grove's Japanese edition.

References
Masakata Kanazawa, "Minao Shibata". The New Grove Dictionary of Music and Musicians, 2nd edition.

1916 births
1996 deaths
Japanese composers
Japanese male composers
Musicians from Tokyo
20th-century Japanese male musicians